Bitra, also known as Bitrā Par, is a coral atoll belonging to the Amindivi Subgroup of islands of the Union Territory of Lakshadweep in India.

History
Prior to the 20th century, islanders from Kiltan and Chetlat visited the island to collect the eggs of pelagic birds breeding there. Until 1945, when a woman from Chetlat made this island her home, there were no attempts to settle this island permanently. There is a small shrine dedicated to an old Arab saint by the name of Malik Mulla who was buried on the island. The shrine has become a pilgrimage site.

Geography
The atoll of Bitra encompasses two islands.
The main Bitra Island  is located at the northern end of the Bitrā Par coral reef .
The small south cay is located on the southern part of the coral reef . 
Bitra is the smallest of the populated islands of Lakshadweep. It is located 33 km to the north of Perumal Par and 41 km to the southeast of Byramgore Reef.

Population
The 2011 census determined that 271 people made this island their home, making it the least populated among the inhabited islands in Lakshadweep.

Administration
The atoll belongs to the township of Bitra of Aminidivi Tehsil.

Transportation
The main island has a small jetty on the south shore and a helipad on the westpoint.

Economics
The inhabitants on the island are engaged in very small scale farming and fishing which are mainly for the island consumption.

Image gallery

References

External links

Bitra Island

Islands of Lakshadweep
Atolls of India
Cities and towns in Lakshadweep district
Islands of India
Populated places in India